Toshiharu Nakamura (born 23 December 1935) is a Japanese field hockey player. He competed in the men's tournament at the 1960 Summer Olympics.

References

External links
 

1935 births
Living people
Japanese male field hockey players
Olympic field hockey players of Japan
Field hockey players at the 1960 Summer Olympics
Sportspeople from Aichi Prefecture